Aani Aanisson Rysstad (13 July 1894, in Valle – 18 December 1965) was a Norwegian politician for the Labour Party.

He was elected to the Norwegian Parliament from Aust-Agder in 1945, but was not re-elected in 1949. He served in the position of deputy representative during the terms 1937–1945 and 1954–1957.

He was born in Valle. On the local political level Rysstad was a member of Hylestad municipal council from 1922 to 1955, serving as mayor in 1934–1937 and deputy mayor in the periods 1937–1940, 1945–1947 and 1947–1951.

He was a member of the national Labour Party board from 1937 to 1953.

References

1894 births
1965 deaths
People from Valle, Norway
Labour Party (Norway) politicians
Members of the Storting
Mayors of places in Aust-Agder
20th-century Norwegian politicians